The 2019 Ukrainian presidential election was held on 31 March and 21 April in a two-round system.

As none of the 39 candidates on the ballot received an absolute majority of the initial vote, a runoff was held between the top two vote-getters, Volodymyr Zelenskyy, a television personality, and the incumbent president, Petro Poroshenko. According to the Central Election Commission (CEC), Zelenskyy won the second round with 73.22% of the votes. The election was recognized as free and fair.

Background
According to Ukrainian law, the election of the President of Ukraine must take place on the last Sunday of March of the fifth year of the term of the incumbent president which in this cycle fell on 31 March 2019. The Ukrainian parliament had to approve the date of the presidential election no later than 100 days before the election day which it did on 26 November 2018.

34,544,993 people were eligible to vote in the elections. However, the March 2014 annexation of Crimea by Russia and the occupation of parts of Donetsk Oblast and Luhansk Oblast by separatists (since April 2014) made roughly 12% of eligible voters unable to participate in the elections. The CEC closed all five foreign polling stations in Ukrainian embassies and consulates within Russia ahead of the vote.

Analysis of candidates by the Ukrainian NGO "Chesno" found that Poroshenko had the largest election fund (₴415 million, about $15.4 million), followed by Yulia Tymoshenko with ₴320 million, Zelenskyy with ₴102.8 million, and Serhiy Taruta with ₴98.4 million. By comparison, in the 2010 Ukrainian presidential election, then winner Viktor Yanukovych spent over $40 million and runner-up Tymoshenko spent $36 million.

A total of 2,344 international observers from 17 countries and 19 organizations were officially registered to monitor the elections. A record number of 139 non-governmental Ukrainian organizations were registered as observers.

Candidates

According to Ukrainian law, a presidential candidate must be a citizen of Ukraine who is at least 35 years old, can speak the (state) Ukrainian language and has lived in Ukraine for the last ten years prior to election day. Candidates were nominated by a political party, or by self-nomination. Candidates also had to submit a declaration of income for the year preceding the election year. This document was then scrutinized by the National Agency for Prevention of Corruption, which subsequently published the results of the audit. Nominations could be submitted from 31 December 2018 to 4 February 2019. The end of the registration period was 9 February 2019. After a potential candidate provided the required documentation to the CEC, this body had five days to register the candidate or to refuse to do so.

Candidates were required to pay a nomination deposit of ₴2.5 million (approx. US$90,000); only the two candidates that progress to the second round of voting will get this deposit returned (the other deposits will be transferred to the state budget).

By the end of the registration period on 9 February 2019, the CEC had registered 44 candidates for the elections. This meant that the largest number of candidates participated in the elections. In total, 92 people submitted documents to the CEC to participate in the elections. Five candidates withdrew. The CEC refused to register 47 people, most for their failure to pay the deposit.

Candidates could withdraw their candidacy, but not later than 23 days before the election. On 8 March, the CEC approved the final list of candidates. There were a total of 39 candidates for the first round of the election.

Registered candidates

Candidates who withdrew 
Andriy Sadovyi: Mayor of Lviv; his party Self Reliance announced on 3 October 2018 that Sadovyi is its candidate in the election. The CEC registered Sadovyi as a candidate on 8 January. In February Sadovyi talked about withdrawing his candidacy in favour of supporting Anatoliy Hrytsenko as a united candidate from "democratic, anti-corruption forces". He made the decision to withdraw on 1 March and then declared his support for Hrytsenko.
Dmytro Gnap: Journalist; Gnap was nominated by the party Power of the People on 20 January, and became a registered candidate on 8 February. He withdrew from the election on 2 March, also in favor of Anatoliy Hrytsenko.
Serhiy Krivonos: veteran of the War in Donbass; Krivonos was nominated by the party Soldiers of the Anti-Terrorist Operation and subsequently registered by the CEC on 5 February. On 6 March he announced that he was withdrawing from the elections to support incumbent president Petro Poroshenko.
Yevheniy Murayev: People's Deputy of Ukraine; on 10 January 2019, Murayev's party Nashi nominated him for president. The CEC registered his candidacy on 15 January. On 7 March he pulled out of the election favor of Oleksandr Vilkul. He also announced that Vilkul's Opposition Bloc and Nashi would soon merge.
He withdrew from the election on 7 March in favor of Anatoliy Hrytsenko.

Registration denied
The CEC rejected 47 applications (mostly for failure to pay the deposit of ₴2.5 million) of potential candidates, including:

Petro Symonenko: Leader of the Communist Party of Ukraine. His nomination was announced at the party's congress on 1 December 2018. Legally the Communist Party of Ukraine is not banned, but the Ministry of Justice is allowed to prohibit it from participating in elections. The CEC refused to register him as a candidate on 2 February because the statute, name, and symbolism of the Communist Party of Ukraine did not comply with 2015 decommunization laws.
Nadiya Savchenko: People's Deputy of Ukraine and Hero of Ukraine. Savchenko was nominated by her party on 26 January 2019. Her bid to become a candidate was rejected by the CEC on 7 February because she failed to pay the deposit and her party didn't stamp the document regarding her nomination.

Declined candidates 
Andriy Biletsky: People's Deputy of Ukraine and leader of political party National Corps; nominated by his party on 20 November 2018. Biletsky later said that he had no intention of participating in the "farce" of a presidential election.
Vadim Rabinovich: People's Deputy of Ukraine and businessman. On 15 November 2018 Rabinovich announced he would not take part in the presidential election; but that he would top his party's For Life list in the following 2019 Ukrainian parliamentary elections.
Oleh Tyahnybok: Chairman of the party All-Ukrainian Union Svoboda. On 14 October 2018, he announced that he would not be running for president and that the party had instead decided to nominate Koshulynskyi as the candidate of Ukraine's nationalist political forces.
: Tereshchenko stepped down as mayor of Hlukhiv on 1 October 2018 to become a candidate. Yet, during the November–30 December-day martial law in Ukraine he resumed his position as mayor and on 3 January 2019 declared his support for candidate Andriy Sadovyi during a congress of Sadovyi's party Self Reliance.
Svyatoslav Vakarchuk, lead vocalist of the rock band Okean Elzy. At the end of January 2019, Vakarchuk released a video in which he announced that he would not be running for president. Vakarchuk has said he does not back any of the candidates. According to an early March 2019 poll by sociological group "RATING" 64% of the electorate would have liked to see Vakarchuk among the presidential candidates. On 27 March 2019, Vakarchuk posted a video on his Facebook page calling on Ukrainians to think seriously about voting, and not to vote "for a laugh"; this was met with a response by the campaign team of presidential candidate Volodymyr Zelenskyy, who Vakarchuk's comments appeared to be directed towards.
Mykhailo Dobkin: People's Deputy of Ukraine, former Kharkiv mayor and Governor of Kharkiv Oblast.

Ukrainian television coverage
During the 2019 Ukrainian presidential election, various Ukrainian television channels supported a candidate for President of Ukraine.

Five groups supported Poroshenko:
 Petro Poroshenko's Channel 5 and Pryamiy supported Poroshenko and were very critical of Volodymyr Zelenskyy and Yulia Tymoshenko.
 Dmytro Firtash's very powerful Inter supported Yuriy Boyko and Poroshenko.
 Rinat Akhmetov's TRK Ukraina, which is owned by Akhmetov's System Capital Management Holdings, supported Poroshenko, Oleh Lyashko, and Oleksandr Vilkul. Akhmetov's Opposition Bloc nominated Vilkul.
 Pro-Russia Viktor Medvedchuk's Channel 112 and NewsOne supported Poroshenko, Lyashko, and Boyko. Medvedchuk's Opposition Platform — For Life nominated Boyko. The godfather of Medvedchuk's daughter is Vladimir Putin.
 Petro Dyminskyi's ZIK supported Poroshenko's allies allowing them to explain their story while they were under investigation.

Three TV groups were very critical of Poroshenko:
 Ihor Kolomoisky's 1+1 media group supported Volodymyr Zelenskyy. Zeleneskyy worked for Kolomoisky's channel. According to an analysis by Ukrainian NGO  by September 2020 1+1 was not supporting (if not hostile too) Zelenskyy and his Servant of the People party. Detektor Media claimed it was instead promoting For the Future.
 Andriy Sadovyi's Channel 24, supported Anatoliy Hrytsenko and opposed Poroshenko.
 Pro-Russia Yevheniy Murayev's Nash TV supported pro-Russia Vilkul and was against Poroshenko but neutral to Tymoshenko and Lyashko.

Under the state-owned National Public Broadcasting Company, UA:Pershyi was critical of Poroshenko.

Victor Pinchuk's ICTV, Novyi Kanal and STB were neutral.

Results

With a voter turnout of 62.8%, about 18.9 million people voted in the first round of elections on 31 March. Volodymyr Zelenskyy of the Servant of the People and the incumbent President Petro Poroshenko both advanced to the second round of elections on 21 April. In the first round, Zelenskyy earned 30% of the votes compared to Poroshenko's 16%.

Exit polls during the second round of voting predicted that Zelenskyy would win with more than 70% of the votes. With only 3% of the votes counted, the CEC confirmed similar preliminary results. Poroshenko conceded the results of the election in a speech soon after the polls closed and exit-poll data was released. He wrote on Twitter: "We succeeded to ensure free, fair, democratic and competitive elections... I will accept the will of Ukrainian people."

According to the CEC, preliminary results with about 99.27% of the votes counted indicates that Zelenskyy received about 73.19% of the votes to the incumbent president's 24.48%. The final results for both second round candidates were 73.23% and 24.46%.

Reactions 

Poroshenko tweeted that "a new inexperienced Ukrainian president... could be quickly returned to Russia's orbit of influence." Some of Zelenskyy's critics expressed concerns over his close ties with billionaire oligarch Ihor Kolomoyskyi, doubting whether Zelenskyy would be able to stand up against the country's influential oligarchs and the Russian President Vladimir Putin.

Several European Union nations offered their congratulations and hopes of continued partnerships in the future. British Foreign Secretary Jeremy Hunt said that Zelenskyy "will now truly be the Servant of the People." Similar sentiments were expressed by Andrzej Duda, President of Poland, Donald Tusk, the President of the European Council, and NATO Secretary General Jens Stoltenberg. Russia's deputy foreign minister, Grigory Karasin, stated that "The new leadership now must understand and realise the hopes of its electors" in both domestic and foreign policy.

Canada's Prime Minister Justin Trudeau congratulated Zelenskyy and thanked the Canadians among the observers overseeing the elections. The President of the United States, Donald Trump, called the president-elect to congratulate him and "the Ukrainian people for a peaceful [and] democratic election."

A joint letter of congratulations was issued by both Tusk and Jean Claude Juncker, the President of the European Commission. The European Union (EU) leaders stated that they hoped Zelenskyy's victory would speed up the implementation of the remaining parts of the EU-Ukraine Association Agreement, including the Deep and Comprehensive Free Trade Area.

See also
 2019 Ukrainian parliamentary election
 Opinion polling for the next Ukrainian presidential election

References

External links

Central Election Commission

Presidential
Presidential elections in Ukraine
March 2019 events in Ukraine
April 2019 events in Ukraine
Volodymyr Zelenskyy
Petro Poroshenko
Yulia Tymoshenko